Lawrence Palmer (born January 7, 1938 in Malden, Massachusetts) is an American former ice hockey player. He won a gold medal at the 1960 Winter Olympics.

References 
 

1938 births
American men's ice hockey goaltenders
Ice hockey players from Massachusetts
Ice hockey players at the 1960 Winter Olympics
Living people
Medalists at the 1960 Winter Olympics
Olympic gold medalists for the United States in ice hockey
Sportspeople from Malden, Massachusetts